Hapinas is a Philippine television show broadcast by QTV. It aired simulcast over Moms Radio. It premiered on April 1, 2006. The show concluded on February 1, 2008.

References

2006 Philippine television series debuts
2008 Philippine television series endings
Filipino-language television shows
Philippine television shows
Q (TV network) original programming